Platycleis affinis is an insect species belonging to the subfamily Tettigoniinae of family Tettigoniidae. It is found in Southern Europe. Research led by Karim Vahed found that the testes of this bush cricket account for 14% of its total body weight.

References

Orthoptera of Europe
Tettigoniinae
Insects described in 1853